The Main road 3 is a west–east direction First class main road in Hungary, that connects Budapest with Tornyosnémeti (the border of Slovakia).

The existing route is a main road with two traffic lanes, except for introductory path of Gyöngyös, which is partially built with four traffic lanes. Most of the traffic was taken over by M3, and M30 motorway.

The road, as well as all other main roads in Hungary, is managed and maintained by Magyar Közút, state owned company.

See also

 Roads in Hungary

Sources

External links

 Hungarian Public Road Non-Profit Ltd. (Magyar Közút Nonprofit Zrt.)
 National Infrastructure Developer Ltd.

Main roads in Hungary
Pest County
Heves County
Borsod-Abaúj-Zemplén County